

Lake Hawdon South Conservation Park is a protected area located in the Australian state of South Australia in the locality of Bray about  south-east of the state capital of Adelaide and about  east of the town of Robe.

The conservation park consists of crown land in Sections 177 and 178 of the cadastral unit of the Hundred of Bray. It came into existence on 18 February 2010 by proclamation under the National Parks and Wildlife Act 1972. On the same day, a separate proclamation ensured that “certain existing and future rights of entry, prospecting, exploration or mining” permitted under the state's Petroleum and Geothermal Energy Act 2000 would apply to the extent of the conservation park.

The lake contains extensive areas of sedgelands including species such as Gahnia trifida, Gahnia filum, Baumea arthrophylla, Baumea juncea and Juncus kraussii.

In 2010, the conservation park's conservation significance was described as follows:
 It supports biota of conservation significance including “17 vertebrate fauna species, seven plant species and three plant communities.”
 Two plant communities are considered vulnerable at a state and regional level, being the “Baumea juncea / B. arthrophylla sedgeland on the western side of the lake and Gahnia filum / G. trifida sedgeland.”
 It contains about 100 native fauna species including the western grey kangaroo, wombat and bush rat, eight amphibian species and 15 reptile species including the state endangered glossy grass skink.

The conservation park is classified as an IUCN Category VI protected area.

See also
Protected areas of South Australia
Lake Hawdon System Important Bird Area

References

External links
Lake Hawdon South Conservation Park webpage on the Protected Planet website

Conservation parks of South Australia
Protected areas established in 2010
2010 establishments in Australia
Limestone Coast